Jeremy S. LaCombe is an American attorney and politician serving as a member of the Louisiana House of Representatives from the 18th district. He assumed office in 2019 after a special election.

Early life and education 
LaCombe was born in Fordoche, Louisiana. He earned a Bachelor of Arts degree in political science from Northwestern State University in 1999 and a Juris Doctor from the Paul M. Hebert Law Center at Louisiana State University in 2004.

Career 
In 2004 and 2005, LaCombe worked as a law clerk at Fisher, Boyd, Brown, Boudreaux & Huguenard. In 2005 and 2006, he served as assistant district attorney of Caddo Parish, Louisiana. He was also an attorney at LeBlanc & Waddell. Since 2008, he has worked as an attorney at the LaCrombe Law Firm. LaCombe was elected to the Louisiana House of Representatives in a March 2019 special election, succeeding Major Thibaut. LaCombe also serves as vice chair of the House Select Committee on Homeland Security.

References 

Living people
People from Pointe Coupee Parish, Louisiana
Northwestern State University alumni
Louisiana State University Law Center alumni
Louisiana lawyers
Members of the Louisiana House of Representatives
Year of birth missing (living people)